Joseph B. Littlejohn House is a historic home located at Oxford, Granville County, North Carolina built between about 1820 and 1832. Originally the residence of Anna Maria and Joseph Blount Littlejohn, it is a two-story, five bay, transitional Federal / Georgian style heavy timber frame dwelling.

William A. Devin (1871–1959) lived in the house as a child, and Frank William Bullock Jr. owned it during the 1970s and early 1980s. It was listed on the National Register of Historic Places in 1988.

References

Houses on the National Register of Historic Places in North Carolina
Georgian architecture in North Carolina
Federal architecture in North Carolina
Houses completed in 1838
Houses in Granville County, North Carolina
National Register of Historic Places in Granville County, North Carolina